John David Smith (born March 12, 1969) is an American college basketball coach. He is currently the head coach of the Cal Poly Mustangs men's basketball team.

Playing career
A standout at John W. North High School, Smith originally began his college basketball career at UNLV under Jerry Tarkanian, who coached Smith's father, Fred "Lucky" Smith, while he was the head coach at Riverside City College. Smith would finish his playing career at Dominican where he played for his brother Steve, and was a NAIA All-California honorable mention and all-conference selection. Smith graduated from Dominican in 1994 with a bachelor's degree in psychology.

Coaching career
Smith's coaching career included stops at the College of Southern Idaho and Chaffey College as well as the high school ranks at his alma mater J.W. North, and Valley View High School as an assistant coach. In 2000, Smith was hired was the head coach and assistant athletic director at San Bernardino Valley College. He would guide the team to an 88–40 record in four seasons, including a Foothill Conference championship during the 2002–03 season. In 2004, Smith accepted the head coaching position at Riverside City College where he went 196–87 with four conference championships including the 2009 California State Championship, the school's first in 43 years since when Jerry Tarkanian was coaching.

Smith accepted the position of assistant coach at Cal State Fullerton under Dedrique Taylor in 2013. He would stay on staff for six seasons and was part of the Titans' Big West Conference tournament-winning squad and 2018 NCAA tournament appearance.

On March 28, 2019, Smith was named the head coach at Cal Poly, replacing Joe Callero.

Personal life
Smith's son Jamal currently plays for Cal State Fullerton, while his daughter Kianna plays basketball at Louisville. His father "Lucky" also played college basketball at Utah State and Hawaii, and was a sixth round selection of the Milwaukee Bucks in the 1968 NBA draft.

Head coaching record

References

Living people
American men's basketball coaches
American men's basketball players
Basketball coaches from California
Basketball players from Riverside, California
Cal Poly Mustangs men's basketball coaches
Cal State Fullerton Titans men's basketball coaches
College men's basketball head coaches in the United States
Dominican University of California alumni
Riverside City Tigers men's basketball coaches
Sportspeople from Riverside, California
UNLV Runnin' Rebels basketball players
1969 births